Zahari Point (Nos Zahari \'nos za-'ha-ri\) is an ice-free point on the southwest coast of Robert Island  in the South Shetland Islands, Antarctica forming the northwest side of the entrance to Micalvi Cove.  Ice-free surface area .  The feature is named after the Bulgarian writer and historiographer Zahari Stoyanov (1850–1889).

Location

Map
 L.L. Ivanov et al. Antarctica: Livingston Island and Greenwich Island, South Shetland Islands. Scale 1:100000 topographic map.  Sofia: Antarctic Place-names Commission of Bulgaria, 2005.

Notes

References
 Zahari Point. SCAR Composite Gazetteer of Antarctica
 Bulgarian Antarctic Gazetteer. Antarctic Place-names Commission. (details in Bulgarian, basic data in English)

External links
 Zahari Point. Copernix satellite image

Headlands of Robert Island
Bulgaria and the Antarctic